SM UB-115 was a German Type UB III submarine or U-boat in the German Imperial Navy during World War I. She was commissioned into the German Imperial Navy on 28 May 1918 as SM UB-115. She was the only German submarine commissioned with the number 115.

Construction

She was built by Blohm & Voss of Hamburg and following just under a year of construction, launched at Hamburg on 4 November 1917. UB-115 was commissioned in the spring the next year under the command of Oblt.z.S. Reinhold Thomsen. Like all Type UB III submarines, UB-115 carried 10 torpedoes and was armed with a  deck gun. UB-115 had a displacement of  while surfaced and  when submerged. Her engines enabled her to travel at  when surfaced and  when submerged.

Fate
All 39 men aboard the submarine died in the attack and sinking.

UB-115s wreck lies in two pieces and is covered in soft corals and an accretion formed from fly ash from a local power plant.

Summary of raiding history

References

Notes

Citations

Bibliography 

 

German Type UB III submarines
World War I submarines of Germany
U-boats commissioned in 1918
1917 ships
Ships built in Hamburg
U-boats sunk in 1918
U-boats sunk by depth charges
U-boats sunk by British aircraft
U-boats sunk by British warships
World War I shipwrecks in the North Sea
Ships lost with all hands
Maritime incidents in 1918